The George Cobb House is a historic house located at 24 William Street in Worcester, Massachusetts. Built about 1875, it is a well-preserved and little-altered example of late Gothic Revival architecture. The house was listed on the National Register of Historic Places on March 5, 1980.

Description and history
The house is set in a predominantly residential area just west of Worcester's central business district, on the north side of William Street. It is a -story wood-frame house, with a slate hip roof, slightly projecting central gabled pavilion, clapboard siding, and a granite foundation. Its front facade, facing south, is three bays wide, with single-story polygonal bay windows flanking the entrance. The entrance, set in the projecting pavilion, is sheltered by a porch that extends between the near corners of the flanking bays, with supporting square columns, arched openings, and a low balustrade. On the second level, a three-part round-arch window is set above the entrance under a stylized cap. The gable of the projecting section has Stick style bargeboard, and is flanked at the roof level by gabled dormers with a simplified version of the same decoration. Windows on the side elevations have bracketed sills and lintels, with the first-floor lintels capped by gabled cornices, and those on the second floor flat. A two-story polygonal bay projects from the right side, just below a steeply pitched gable.

The house was built about 1875, and was first occupied by George Cobb, a fish and oyster merchant.

See also
National Register of Historic Places listings in northwestern Worcester, Massachusetts
National Register of Historic Places listings in Worcester County, Massachusetts

References

Gothic Revival architecture in Massachusetts
Houses completed in 1875
Houses in Worcester, Massachusetts
National Register of Historic Places in Worcester, Massachusetts
Houses on the National Register of Historic Places in Worcester County, Massachusetts